Timur Ilkhanovich Zakirov (born 14 February 1970) is a Russian football coach and a former player.

His son, also named Timur Zakirov, is also a professional footballer.

References

1970 births
Living people
Soviet footballers
FC Kuban Krasnodar players
FC Spartak-UGP Anapa players
Russian footballers
FC Chernomorets Novorossiysk players
Russian Premier League players
Russian football managers
Association football forwards
Association football midfielders